Chikkodi is a taluka and Town Municipal Council in the Belagavi district of Karnataka, India. It is a Subdivision of the district. Chikodi, Athani, Hukkeri, Raybag, Nipani and Kagwad are the taluks that come under Chikodi Subdivision. It is 75 kilometers from the city of Belgaum, 65 kilometers from Kolhapur, 51 kilometers from Miraj, 160 kilometers from Hubballi, and 570 kilometers from the capital of Karnataka state, Bengaluru. Chikodi has many district level offices but it is not designated as a district by the Government of Karnataka. It is one of the major cities that lies in the border between Karnataka and Maharashtra states.official language is Kannada.

History

It was a major trading place. Thursday  market dates back to 1720, as mentioned by captain Moore .Around 200–300 years ago, Chikkodi was called as Chik-kodi (small village), while the nearby Hirekudi (big village) was bigger than Chikodi. Over time, Chikodi experienced growth due to its famous betel leaves and its position on major roads. Chikodi has always had strong religious ties for Jains, Hindus, Christians and Muslims. It enjoys rich cultural diversity stemming from its proximity to the state of Maharashtra. Kannada is the main language that is spoken. The customs and traditions of Chikodi have been influenced by both the Kannadiga and Maratha cultures.

Geography 

It has an average elevation of 683 meters (2240 feet). The town has an area of 18.29 km2, and is situated amidst hills. The topography within 2 kilometers of Chikodi contains significant variations in elevation as it is surrounded by range of hills, with a maximum elevation change of 169 meters and an average elevation above sea level of 657 meters. The Krishna river, which has water almost throughout the year, is the chief source of agricultural and drinking water for local people living in the surrounding villages. The other river
system of the taluka consists of Vedganga, Dudhaganga and Panchganga. Ground water resources are also extensively tapped in foothills which are easily accessible to borewells, canals and creeks around. Nestling among the hillocks and sylvan surroundings, it is indeed an ideal place for trails and easy to moderate hikes. There's a famous telephone tower atop Chandrakori Hills which renders mesmerizing views of the city.

Chikodi taluka is generally divided into two zones on the basis of terrain. The Northern part consists of the deep and good black soil on the bank of the rivers flowing from west to east, therefore it is a very fertile tract. While the southern hilly area land consists of red clay soil, having comparatively less fertile. Of course, there are small patches of coarse land in northern part and good fertile land in the southern part of the taluka.

Climate 
Chikodi has a tropical savanna climate. The wet season is pleasant, windy, and overcast while the dry season is hot and partly cloudy. The dry season lasts for 2.5 months, from 9 March to 23 May, with an average daily high temperature above 34 °C. Chikodi receives rainfall from both the northeast and the southwest monsoons and the wettest months are June–September. The rainy period of the year lasts for 6.1 months, from 14 May to 18 November, with a sliding 31-day rainfall of at least 13 millimeters. The most rain falls during the 31 days centered around 18 July, with an average total accumulation of 239 millimeters. 
Over the course of the year, the temperature typically varies from 14 °C to 37 °C and is rarely below 13 °C or above 39 °C. December & January are generally cold as compared to the rest of year. The coldest month is January with an average low temperature of 14 °C and the hottest month is April with an average high temperature of 35.7 °C. Winter temperatures rarely drop below 13 °C (55.4 °F), and summer temperatures seldom exceed 38 °C.

Demographics 

 India census, Chikodi had a population of 38,307. Males constitute 51% of the population and females 49%. The average literacy rate is 73%, higher than the national average of 59.5%; with male literacy at 79% and female literacy at 66%.

Business
Chikodi is mostly dependent on agriculture. Sugarcane occupies an important place in the economy of Chikodi which has three sugar factories, Doodhaganga Krishna Sugar Factory which is the nearest, Venkateshwara Power Project Ltd. Bedkihal, and Om Sugars Ltd. Jainapur among others. Tobacco farming is another major agricultural sector. Major production of tobacco comes from Galatga, Shiragaonwadi, Tapakarwadi, and Khadaklat villages. Recently the trend of Sericulture is picking up.

Renewable power projects at Chikodi

Wind power project 
The project activity is a cleaner means for power generation which avoids fossil fuel based thermal power generation. It is an energy diversification measure where wind energy which is a renewable energy, is harnessed for generation of power in order to suffice the increasing energy demand in the villages around Chikodi. 
It will help to improve the availability of electricity as the electricity generated will be fed into the grid thereby curtailing the supply demand gap. The generated electricity is supplied to the Karnataka Power Transmission Corporation Limited (KPTCL) which distributes it as per the state policy. The land prices in the neighboring area have gone up thereby benefiting the villagers. Total nominal power expected is around 18 MW. A range of wind farms can be seen around a radius of 5 km from the city. Wind farms generate clean renewable electricity without any greenhouse gas emissions or waste byproducts thus mitigating climate change. This electricity displaces electricity generation in fossil fuel dominated grid resulting in savings of coal.

Solar power plant 
A solar photovoltaic (PV) power plant in Itnal, Chikodi, was set up in the year 2009 by Karnataka Power Corporation Limited. The installed capacity of plant is 3 MW. There are totally 13,104 modules of each 250 MW rating in an area of 17 acres. Totally 12 Inverters of each 250KW rating are used to convert the generated DC voltage into AC Voltage. There are totally 3 three phase transformers of each with rating of 1MW. The generated power is sold to KPTCL. The plant has been established at a cost of Rs 60 Crore. It is catering for 80% of the region's energy requirements with the 4000MWh it produces each year, thereby providing reliable power to the farmers in nearby villages. It is located near Umarani village at coordinates 16.401750,74.664067, about 11 km from Chikodi.

Tourism and attractions 

Chandrakori Ganesh Temple - situated on top of Chandrakori hill, is a very famous temple of lord Ganesha. This temple can be reached through well-paved steps laid from Indira nagar. 
Parati Nagalingeswara (Parati Nagappa) temple located about 2.5 km away from the Central bus stand, is one of the famous temples around the city.
Yadur - Shree Veerbhadra temple is situated in the holy Shri Kshetra Yadur, on the banks of river Krishna located about 20 km from Chikodi
Karoshi - Shree Basavanna temple (Ghatti Basavanna) is situated in the holy place of Karoshi, is located about 7 km from Chikodi. It has a famous Darga, also this indicates the communal harmony it has. This place is agriculturally sound.
Shantigiri Jain Temple - It is about 10 km from Chikodi. This village is considered as one of the highlighted centers of Jain history, where Shri Shantigiri Tirth is also situated.
Chinchani - Having Allamprabhu Sidd Sansthan Math, Shri Basaveshwar temple (Gudadagind Basavan) located about 5 km from Chikodi.
Toranahalli- Famous for Bhagavan Hanuman temple located in this village, it is about 10 km from Chikodi.
Shiragaon - Famous for Basaveshwara temple and it is near 11 km from Chikodi.
Gokak Falls (Near Gokak) & Narsobawadi (Maharashtra) are also near to the city.
Hidkal Dam - also known as Raja Lakhamagouda dam, is a dam constructed across the Ghataprabha River in the Krishna River basin. It is about 40 km from Chikodi.
Basavanal Gadde- Lakkavva Temple in Laxmi Nagar is one of the oldest temples in around the town.
Basavanal Gadde- Hanuman Temple in Hanuman Nagar is very famous in the region.
Karagaon -  from the city, Karisiddeshwar temple is the largest temple, also a village god and has a huge number of devotees outside the village, apparently a crowded fair dedicated to Karisiddeshwar takes place in the time of Deepavali.

Education

Chikodi is considered as an education hub in Belagavi district for its educational institutions and facilities. There are numerous government and private schools and colleges which provide education from primary to college level offering different courses in Kannada, English and Marathi medium.

Dispute regarding District status

Belagavi district is the largest district in the Karnataka so bifurcation of district is evident. Bifurcation of Belagavi district, which includes a total of 14 taluka's, has been a long pending issue. Government of Karnataka has already provided the District level offices to Chikodi which would help in the development of neighbouring talukas of Chikodi, Hukkeri, Athani, Raybag, Nippani, and Kagawad. But as of now, no decision has been made regarding bifurcation of Belagavi district and Government of Karnataka has not granted Chikodi a separate district status.

Transport

Majority of public transport in Chikodi connecting surrounding villages and towns is through city buses run by North West Karnataka Road Transport Corporation (NWKRTC) from Chikodi central bus stand. Auto rickshaws are commonly available for commuting inside the city

Road

Chikodi is well connected by road with major State Highways which connect to National Highway 48 which was earlier designated as NH 4 before all the National Highways were renumbered in the year 2010. The State Highways passing through Chikodi are: KA SH 18 (Mudhol to Nipani), KA SH 12 (Vijayapur to Sankeshwar) and SH 78 (Ichalakaranji to Hattargi).

State Highway 12 has been declared as the National Highway which goes from Sankeshwar to Vijayapur via Gotur-Chikodi-Kagawad-Athani-Tikota.

NWKRTC runs buses from Chikodi to all corners of Karnataka as well as neighboring states. There are many prominent private bus services too.

Rail

This station falls under South Western Railway Zone.

Air

See also
Adi (Chikkodi)
Hattarawat
Karagaon

References

External links

Chikodi Town Municipal Council

Cities and towns in Belagavi district